Mathey is a surname. Notable people with the surname include:

Dean Mathey (1890–1972), American tennis player
George Antonio Bell Mathey (born 1959), better known as George Bell, American baseball player
Jean Baptiste Mathey (1630–1696), French architect and painter
Paul Mathey (1844–1929), French painter and engraver
Pedro Mathey (1928–1985), Peruvian cyclist
Roger Mathey (born 1969), American theatrical director, as well as a playwright, actor, producer, and filmmaker

See also 
Mathey College, is one of six residential colleges at Princeton University, New Jersey
Mathey-Tissot, is a Swiss watch maker